Taems or TAEMS or TÆMS may refer to:
 Atreyee D. A. V. Public School, a school in India
 Task analysis environment modeling simulation (computer science), a multi-agent task modeling language
 Terminal Area Energy Management, a guidance system used in the final phase of a Space Shuttle landing (referred to as the TAEMs).

See also
 Pha Taem
 Taema
 Taemado